Dharmavaram Ramakrishnamacharyulu (1853 – 30 November 1912) was a Telugu dramatist and playwright from Bellary. He was known as "Andhra Nataka Pithamaha" and wrote more than 30 original plays.

Early life
He was born in Dharmavaram town in Anantapur district, Andhra Pradesh in 1853 (Karthika Sudha Ekadasi). His parents were Krishnamacharyulu and Laxmidevamma; his family name was Komanduru. He lost his father when he was 16 years of age and the family responsibility fell on his shoulders. After Matriculation, he worked for some time in the Municipal High School and Adoni Taluk Office. He returned to Bellary and started practising as vakil in the Cantonment. He lost his wife soon after marriage and later married Laxmidevamma. He had passed first-grade pleader's examination and F.A. in 1874. He had three brothers and three sisters. His sisters were Pedda Seshamma, Chinna Seshamma and Krishnamma. Pedda Seshamma was the mother of Bellary Raghava. His brothers were Dharmavaram Gopalacharyulu, Venkata Krishnamacharyulu and Seshacharyulu.

Career
During the famine between 1871-73, he and his friends established a society called Veera Sangam, to serve those affected. After the famine, it was converted into a debating society. He initially wrote four short plays which were successful. In 1888, the society was replaced by the famous Sarasa Vinodini Sabha.

Influenced by the success of Kannada dramas staged by Rajadhani Nataka Mandali in 1881, his brother Gopalacharyulu wrote a drama in Telugu and staged it. It did not make any impact on the public. Having felt insulted, Krishnamacharyulu wrote a drama himself in Kannada Swapna Niruddhamu and staged it in 1886. The drama impressed the public very much.  There was an opinion that the Telugu language was not suitable for drama format. He took up the partly written Telugu drama Chitra Naliyam and completed it. He directed the play and took the lead role on 29 January 1887. The play was successful, which helped combat the stigma against Telugu's use in playwrights. He wrote about 29 dramas successively and staged them with success. He introduced songs and poems in the drama. He took his troupe to Madras and staged his plays in 1891 at Victoria Public Hall. Pammal Sambandha Mudaliar, inspired by these dramas, established Suguna Vilas Sabha. He wrote about 90 dramas in Tamil and staged them. He was considered a modern Tamil Nataka Pithamaha. He recognized Ramakrishnamacharyulu as his Guru.

Many of his plays were performed by the Surabhi Drama Troupe, the most noted one being Bhakta Prahlada which was made into a movie, the first Telugu talkie movie. Ramakrishna Vilas, a theatre building in Bellary named after Dharmavaram Ramakrishnamacharyulu, was the second theatre building in Bellary.  This was later converted into a cinema theatre and renamed as Star Cinema.

References

Notes
 Dharmavaram Ramakrishnamacharyulu in Makers of Indian Literature By Ponangi Sri Rama Apparao, Sahitya Akademi, New Delhi, 1989. .Complete book online

Telugu people
People from Bellary
1853 births
1912 deaths
People from Anantapur district
People from Rayalaseema